St Peter and St Paul's Church, Church Warsop is a Grade I listed parish church in the Church of England in Church Warsop.

Several gravestones, the boundary wall, gates, piers and overthrow in the churchyard are Grade II listed. Warsop parish centre in the church grounds is Grade II* listed

History

The church was built in the 11th century. It was restored and re-roofed, and a new organ chamber built in 1878.

Gallery

References

Church of England church buildings in Nottinghamshire
Grade I listed churches in Nottinghamshire